Alberto Carpani (23 April 1956 – 11 May 2020) was an Italian singer, best known for his Italo disco releases in the late 1970s and early 1980s as Albert One, and his Eurodance release "Sing a Song Now Now" in 1999 as A.C. One. He was also a DJ and music producer.

Career 
Alberto Carpani was known in the 1980s. He released the singles "Yes No Family", "Turbo Diesel", "Heart on Fire", "Lady O", "For Your Love", "Secrets", "Hopes & Dreams", "Everybody", "Visions", and "Loverboy". They were released by ZYX Music and Baby Records.

He was known as A1, Jock Hattle, Albert One, and A.C. One. He was involved in many Italo projects such as Clock On 5, Enola, Funny Twins, Tom Dollar, and X-One.

His last major hit, the 1999 single "Sing a Song Now Now", reached number 6 in the Spanish music charts.

Death 
Carpani died of a lung infection from COVID-19 in Italy on 11 May 2020, during the COVID-19 pandemic in Italy.

Discography

Studio albums
As Albert One

Singles
 "Turbo Diesel" (1984)
 "Heart on Fire" (1985)
 "Lady O" (1985)
 "For Your Love" (1986)
 "Secrets" (1986)
 "Hopes & Dreams" (1987)
 "Everybody" (1988)
 "Visions" (1988)
 "Loverboy" (1989)
 "All You want" (1993)
 "Mandy" (1998)
 "Music" (2002)
 "Face to Face" (2015)
 "All for One" (2017)

As A.C. One

Compilation appearances
"Turbo Diesel" on High Energy (1984)
"Lady O" on 38º De Sannido (1985) and Sannido Discoteca (1985)
"Secrets" on Fior Di Loto 1 (1986), The Best of Italo Disco Vol. 7 (1986) and Discomix Vol. 2 (1986)
"Hopes & Dreams" on The Best of Italo-Disco Vol. 9 (1987)
"For Your Love" on The Best of Italo-Disco Vol. 8 (1987)
"Vision" on The House Sound of Europe – Vol. V – 'Casa Latina (1989)
"Hopes and Dreams" on City Dance Music 2 (1989)
"Loverboy" on Best Disco Vol. 7 (1989)
"This Is Real" on Gira La Palla Compilation (1993)

Albert One's remix of Barry Manilow's "Mandy" was featured on Mixage (1999) and Feten Boot Mix Vol. 1 (1999).

Citations

External links
 

1956 births
2020 deaths
Musicians from Pavia
Eurodance musicians
English-language singers from Italy
20th-century Italian  male singers
21st-century Italian  male singers
Italian Italo disco musicians
ZYX Music artists
Deaths from the COVID-19 pandemic in Liguria